Future Graph, Inc. also known as Futuregraph was a publisher of math and science educational software used in hundreds of secondary schools and universities. They are best known for f(g) Scholar, a data analysis program which featured a scientific calculator, graphing, and spreadsheet.

Software
In addition to f(g) Scholar, Future Graph sold other software including a Personal Professor, Home Teachers Series, and also a collection of clipart.

References

Bibliography

External links
 Future Graph, Inc. on Amazon: , 

Defunct software companies of the United States